Far Wes is a reissue of Montgomeryland, a 1958 album by the American jazz group the Montgomery Brothers, including guitarist Wes Montgomery.

Reception 

In his AllMusic review, music critic Scott Yanow called Far Wes a "historical album" and wrote Montgomery's "sound was already quite recognizable."

Track listing
"Far Wes" (Wes Montgomery) – 5:51
"Leila" (Montgomery) – 3:28
"Old Folks" (Willard Robison, Dedette Hill) – 6:35
"Wes' Tune" (Montgomery) – 4:08
"Hymn for Carl" (Harold Land) – 4:33
"Montgomeryland Funk" (Montgomery) – 4:00
"Stompin' at the Savoy" (Edgar Sampson, Benny Goodman, Chick Webb) – 4:22
"Monk's Shop" (Montgomery) – 3:54
"Summertime" (George Gershwin, DuBose Heyward) – 4:50
"Falling in Love with Love" (Richard Rodgers, Lorenz Hart) – 6:13
"Renie" (Montgomery) – 3:31

Original release track listing
Monk's Shop - 3:58
Summertime - 4:53
Falling in Love - 6:16
Renie - 3:33
Far Wes - 5:55
Leila - 3:30
Old Folks - 6:38
Wes' Tune - 4:11

Personnel 
 Wes Montgomery – guitar
 Pony Poindexter – alto saxophone (tracks 8-11)
 Harold Land – tenor saxophone (tracks 1-7)
 Buddy Montgomery – piano
 Monk Montgomery – electric bass
 Tony Bazley – drums (tracks 1-7)
 Louis Hayes – drums (tracks 8-11)

Releases 

Light Music Club PLP-804 (original release)

References 

Wes Montgomery albums
1958 albums
Pacific Jazz Records albums
Albums produced by Michael Cuscuna